Maria Christina of Saxony (Maria Christina Albertina Carolina; 7 December 1770 – 24 November 1851) was a Princess of Saxony. She was the Princess of Carignano and later Princess of Montléart by marriage.

Early life 

Maria Christina was the only surviving child of Prince Charles of Saxony, Duke of Courland, himself son of King Augustus III of Poland, and his wife, Countess Franciszka Krasińska. Her parents married secretly in Warsaw in 1760. The marriage was considered morganatic in Saxony. Her mother was created a princess (Princess Franziska Krasińska Wettin) in her own right due to her marriage, only after the intervention of Emperor Joseph II.

Biography 
Her education was in the hands of several private tutors and governesses. She learned philosophy, geography, literature, music, dance, and was taught several languages (German, Italian, French, Polish, and English).

In Turin on 24 October 1797, she married Charles Emmanuel of Savoy Prince of Carignano (d.1800). They had two children:

 Charles Albert of Savoy-Carignano (2 October 1798 – 28 July 1849), King of Sardinia in 1831, who married Maria Theresa of Austria and had issue.
 Princess Elisabetta of Savoy Carignano (13 April 1800 – 25 December 1856), who married Archduke Rainer of Austria and had issue.
Three years after his marriage Charles Emmanuel died in a French prison.

On 1 February 1810 in Paris she married Julius Maximilian de Montléart, 6th Marquis de Rumont, 1st Prince de Montléart (1787–1865). They had five children:

 Jules Maurice (28 November 1807 – 16 March 1887), legitimized after his parents' marriage; Prince de Montléart.
 Louise Bathilde de Montléart (20 January 1809 – 1823), legitimized after her parents' marriage; died young.
 Berthe Maria de Montléart (1811–1831), died young.
 Frédérique Auguste Marie Xavérine Cunégonde Julie de Montléart (11 November 1814 – 30 March June 1885 in Krzyszkowice, by suicide).
 Marguerite Julia de Montléart (1822–1832), died young.

In 1824 Maria Christina and her second husband bought and restored the Schloss Wilhelminenberg in the district of Gallitzinberg.

Maria Christina died in Paris on 24 November 1851 at the age of 80.

Ancestors

References

1770 births
1851 deaths
Nobility from Dresden
German people of Polish descent
Saxon princesses
House of Wettin
Princesses of Carignan
Princesses of Savoy
Albertine branch